Snow protection (snow pro) is a type of natural or artificial protection used in mountaineering as an anchor. Two common artificial devices are the snow fluke and snow picket. It is used both for climbing and for securing tents and other camping gear, designed for use in sand and snow.

A fluke correctly used is buried in the snow, tip pointed down, approximately 40° from the angle of the mountain slope. Flukes can deflect or dislodge in harder-packed or dry snow, and are therefore more reliably used in heavy, moist snow.

See also
 Glossary of climbing terms
 Mountaineering

References

Mountaineering equipment
Climbing equipment